Karaguzhino (Qarağuja) is a rural locality (a village) in Mindyaksky Selsoviet, Uchalinsky District, Bashkortostan, Russia. The population was 79 as of 2010. There are 7 streets.

Geography 
Karaguzhino is located 71 km southwest of Uchaly (the district's administrative centre) by road. Mindyak is the nearest rural locality.

References 

Rural localities in Uchalinsky District